Kirkby Underwood is a village and civil parish in the South Kesteven district of Lincolnshire, England. The population of the civil parish was 200 at the 2001 census, increasing to 220 at the 2011 census. To the east is Rippingale and the Fens. Directly to the south is the hamlet of Stainfield, and to the west, Hawthorpe.

Kirkby Underwood Grade I listed Anglican church is dedicated to St. Mary and All Saints. In 1885 Kelly's Directory described the church as in Perpendicular style, with chancel, nave and south aisle, and a tower containing three bells. It was in a "very ruinous state". The parish register dated from 1569.

The ecclesiastical parish is part of The Ringstone in Aveland Group of the Deanery of Beltisloe, Diosece of Lincoln.  The vicar was the Revd Dr Lynda Pugh between 2012 and 2018. The incumbent is the Revd Neil Bullen. 

Between the village and Hawthorpe is Callan's Lane Wood, run by the Forestry Commission. Near the wood are two radio masts and a BT microwave transmitter.

References

External links

"Kirkby Underwood"; Homepages.which.net. Retrieved 21 April 2012
Kirkby Underwood on the BBC Domesday project

Villages in Lincolnshire
Civil parishes in Lincolnshire
South Kesteven District